Grand Championship may refer to:

Chikara Grand Championship
TNA Grand Championship